Rudjakovia is a monotypic genus of cnidarians belonging to the family Agalmatidae. The only species is Rudjakovia plicata.

The species was described by R. Y. Margulis in 1982.

The species inhabits marine environment.

References

Agalmatidae
Hydrozoan genera